Riverbank or river bank typically refers to

Bank (geography), the bank of a river

It may also refer to:

Places
Riverbank, California
Riverbank, former name of Bryte, California

Enterprises and organizations
Riverbank Academy, a special school in Coventry, England
Riverbank Arts Centre, Newbridge, County Kildare, Ireland
Riverbank West, luxury high-rise apartment building at 560 West 43rd Street in Hell's Kitchen, Manhattan
Riverbanks Zoo, a zoo in South Carolina
The RiverBank, 1920–2011, a Wisconsin bank offering banking, insurance and investment services

Music
"River Bank" (Jamaican song), a 1964 song by Byron Lee and the Dragonaires (adapted as a 1978 single by Headley Bennett)
"River Bank" (Brad Paisley song), a 2014 single by Brad Paisley
"Riverbank" a 2016 song by Bolier feat. Mingue
"The Riverbank", a song by Paul Simon from his album Stranger to Stranger

See also

 
 Creekside (disambiguation)
 Riverside (disambiguation)
 River (disambiguation)
 Bank (disambiguation)

fr:Rive